The 2000–01 Greek Football Cup was the 59th edition of the Greek Football Cup.

Tournament details
Totally 50 teams participated, 16 from Alpha Ethniki, 16 from Beta, and 18 from Gamma. It was held in 6 rounds, including the final. An Additional Round was held between First and Second, with 2 matches, in order that the teams who progress would be 16. In the Group stage, there were 8 groups with 6 teams each, while 2 teams qualified without matches.

For the first time, there were double(home and away) matches in the group stage, thus each team played 10 games. Because the tournament began very early in the summer, in a period where teams should play preparation friendlies, the HFF allowed at the 5 first matches a maximum of 7 substitutions, something unusual in Greece, very probably and internationally, for matches of an official competition.

After the group stage, there were very interesting confrontations, after drawing elected "strong" pairs. In the round of 16, Olympiacos eliminated AEK Athens with two wins. The first leg in Nikos Goumas Stadium was awarded to Olympiacos 2–0 in an eventful match that was abandoned against AEK Athens and while the scoreline was 1–1 at the time. In the second leg, at Olympic Stadium, Olympiacos' home ground then, they shattered AEK Athens 6–1. In the same round, in Thessaloniki's derby between PAOK and Aris, PAOK qualified with a 1–1 away draw and a 2–0 home victory. Remarkable in this round was also the qualification of Panathinaikos against Panionios with a 7–2 second leg demolition, while the first leg ended with a 1–0 win of Panionios.

In the quarter-finals followed the conflict between Olympiacos and Panathinaikos. First leg ended 1–1 in Athens Olympic Stadium, while in the second leg the reds triumphed 4–1 in Apostolos Nikolaidis Stadium against their arch-rivals. More exciting were the semi-finals between Olympiacos and Iraklis. Olympiacos with two victories, 1–0 away and 5–4 at home (in an impressive game where 10 minutes before the end the scoreline was 3–4), qualified for the Final.

The Final was held in Nikos Goumas Stadium, Athens on 12 May 2001. A draw was preceded on 19 April to determine in which stadium/city the final would be hosted (Nikos Goumas/Athens or Lysandros Kaftanzoglou/Thessaloniki) . Olympiacos faced PAOK, 9 years after their last conflict in a cup final and for a 7th clash in total. Several days before the game, Olympiacos president Sokratis Kokkalis made a memorable statement using a Greek expression that Olympiacos would lose the upcoming final only if the devil would break his leg (meaning that it was almost impossible to lose) . However, PAOK easily won the match 4–2 with an impressive performance and earned the trophy 27 years after their last success, in the same stadium against the same opponent. During the awarding ceremony, former goalkeeper of PAOK Mladen Furtula (member of the coaching staff then) whispered to Sokratis Kokkalis that the devil did break his leg that day and Kokkalis responded with a laugh. PAOK manager Dušan Bajević, became the first in history to win the trophy with three different teams. He also won it with AEK Athens in 1996 and Olympiacos in 1999.

Calendar

Group stage
The teams play each other home and away.

Group 1

Group 2

Group 3

Group 4

Group 5

Group 6

Group 7

Group 8

Chalkidona and Apollon Krya Vrysi qualified to the Additional Round without matches.

Knockout phase
Each tie in the knockout phase, apart from the additional round and the final, was played over two legs, with each team playing one leg at home. The team that scored more goals on aggregate over the two legs advanced to the next round. If the aggregate score was level, the away goals rule was applied, i.e. the team that scored more goals away from home over the two legs advanced. If away goals were also equal, then extra time was played. The away goals rule was again applied after extra time, i.e. if there were goals scored during extra time and the aggregate score was still level, the visiting team advanced by virtue of more away goals scored. If no goals were scored during extra time, the winners were decided by a penalty shoot-out. In the additional round and the final, which were played as a single match, if the score was level at the end of normal time, extra time was played, followed by a penalty shoot-out if the score was still level.The mechanism of the draws for each round is as follows:
There are no seedings, and teams from the same group can be drawn against each other.

Additional round

|}

Bracket

Round of 16
The draw took place on 7 December 2000.

Summary

|}

Matches

Panathinaikos won 7–3 on aggregate.

Match abandoned at the 73rd while the game was at 1–1. It was awarded 0–2 to Olympiacos.

Olympiacos won 8–1 on aggregate.

Xanthi won on away goals.

Iraklis won 4–2 on aggregate.

PAOK won 3–1 on aggregate.

Panachaiki won 2–0 on aggregate.

Paniliakos won 3–2 on penalties.

Apollon Athens won on away goals.

Quarter-finals
The draw took place on 1 February 2001.

Summary

|}

Matches

Apollon Athens won 4–1 on aggregate.

Olympiacos won 5–2 on aggregate.

Iraklis won 2–1 on aggregate.

PAOK won 4–1 on aggregate.

Semi-finals
The draw took place on 22 March 2001.

Summary

|}

Matches

PAOK won 5–3 on aggregate.

Olympiacos won 6–4 on aggregate.

Final

References

External links
Greek Cup 2000–2001 at RSSSF
Greek Cup 2000–2001 at Hellenic Football Federation's official site

Greek Football Cup seasons
Greek Cup
Cup